Philip Bracken Fleming (October 15, 1887 – October 6, 1955) was a United States Army general and United States Ambassador to Costa Rica.

Biography
The Iowa-born Fleming was son of John Joseph and Mary Bracken Fleming. From 1905 to 1907 he attended the University of Wisconsin.

Fleming was cadet at the United States Military Academy  from June 15, 1907, until June 13, 1911, when he graduated first in his class. Many of his classmates, such as Charles P. Hall, William H. H. Morris Jr., Alexander Surles, John R. Homer, Raymond A. Wheeler, John P. Lucas, Harry R. Kutz, Herbert Dargue, Ira T. Wyche, Karl S. Bradford, Frederick Gilbreath, Gustav H. Franke, Paul W. Baade, Jesse A. Ladd, Thompson Lawrence, Bethel Wood Simpson, James B. Crawford, Joseph C. Mehaffey, Harold F. Nichols and James R.N. Weaver, became general officers before, during or after World War II

He was promoted to Second Lieutenant, Corps of Engineers.

During his military career, he held the following ranks: August 1, 1935 Lieutenant-Colonel, January 1, 1940 Colonel, February 14, 1941 Brigadier-General (Army of the United States), October 25, 1942 Major-General (Army of the United States), January 31, 1947 Major-General (Regular Army, Retired).

Still serving in the U. S. Army through January 1947, he held several posts in the late 1930s as District Engineer in Maine and Minnesota, then two jobs in the Labor Department, and from December 4, 1941 to May 26, 1949 as Federal Works Administrator.  In 1949 he became Chairman of the US Maritime Commission, and in May 1950 Under-Secretary of Commerce.

From 1951 to 1953, he served as ambassador to Costa Rica. He died on October 6, 1955. Fleming was buried at Arlington National Cemetery.

References

External links
Generals of World War II

1887 births
1955 deaths
People from Burlington, Iowa
University of Wisconsin–Madison alumni
United States Military Academy alumni
Military personnel from Iowa
United States Army Corps of Engineers personnel
United States Army personnel of World War I
Army Black Knights athletic directors
Franklin D. Roosevelt administration personnel
United States Army generals of World War II
Truman administration personnel
United States Army generals
Ambassadors of the United States to Costa Rica
Burials at Arlington National Cemetery